Alkington could refer to a number of English settlements:

Alkington, Shropshire, a village and civil parish in Shropshire
Alkington, Gloucestershire, a civil parish in Gloucestershire

See also

Alkrington, a district of Greater Manchester